Cueva de Saturno, or Saturn Cave, is a cenote cave located near Varadero, Matanzas Province, Cuba. The cave consists of a large opening, the denote, and some offshoot caverns. Stalactites and blind cavefish and cave shrimp. Scuba diving is popular in the cenote itself.

References

Caves of Cuba
Caves of the Caribbean